Karl Rune Valerius Bergström (September 5, 1891 – May 7, 1964) was a Swedish football player who competed in the 1920 Summer Olympics. In the 1920 tournament he was a part of the Swedish football team that finished in 5th place. He won a total of 26 caps and scored five goals for the Sweden national team.

References

External links

1891 births
1964 deaths
Swedish footballers
Sweden international footballers
Olympic footballers of Sweden
Footballers at the 1920 Summer Olympics
Association football forwards
AIK Fotboll players